Cristian Flores Íñiguez (born 30 June 1988) is a Mexican former professional footballer and current manager of the Mexico national under-15 team.

Honours

Player
Mexico U17
FIFA U-17 World Championship: 2005

References

External links
 

1988 births
Living people
Footballers from Guadalajara, Jalisco
Association football goalkeepers
Mexican footballers
Chiapas F.C. footballers
La Piedad footballers
Liga MX players